Anneth Delliecia Nasution (born 18 October 2005) better known as Anneth Delliecia or Anneth,
is an Indonesian singer-songwriter and actress. She is known as the first winner of Indonesian Idol Junior season 3, broadcast by the Indonesia television station RCTI in 2018. Her first single "Tetap Untukmu" and her own written single "Mungkin Hari Ini Esok Atau Nanti" which she created at the age of fourteen have successfully captured the attention of Indonesian music fans. The song went viral and topped charts on various types of digital music platforms in Indonesia.

Life and career

The Voice Kids Indonesia and Indonesian Idol Junior 

Before joining Indonesian Idol Junior for the third season, in 2014 Delliecia had participated in Indonesian Idol Junior First Season which aired on MNC TV station when she was 9 years old. Then in 2017 Delliecia joined The Voice Kids Indonesia season 2 which aired on GTV television station joining the Agnez Mo team. In this singing competition, Delliecia made it into the grand final round. But was eliminated in the top six.  In 2018, Delliecia participated in the Indonesian Idol Junior Third Season and succeeded in winning the grand final held on 14 December 2018.

Performances on Indonesian Idol Junior 2014

Performances on The Voice Kids Indonesia 2017

Performances on Indonesian Idol Junior 2018

Debut Single : Tetap Untukmu & Mungkin Hari Ini Esok Atau Nanti 

On 29 August 2019 Anneth released her first single on her first debut as professional singer, TETAP UNTUKMU, under a label called RANS MUSIC, a label owned by Raffi Ahmad and Nagita Slavina. One year after released, this single became number #1 hits in Viral 50 Indonesia Spotify and some other digital streaming platform. On the same year, she released a compilation album called MIMPIKU JADI NYATA. She also played a role in the same title of Web Series which uploaded in RANS ENTERTAINMENT's youtube channel.

In June 2020, Anneth collaborated with TNT Boys to cover a song from Ariana Grande and Justin Bieber entitled Stuck With U. This collaboration was carried out online due to the condition of the world which is facing the corona virus. But they hope that someday they can collaborate and meet in person.

On 18 October 2020, right on her 15th birthday, her 2nd single released. This song was written by the fourteen years-old singer-songwriter herself. MUNGKIN HARI INI ESOK ATAU NANTI hit 80 million views in RANS MUSIC's youtube channel within 6 months. The song became the top chart on almost all music platforms in Indonesia.

In June 2021, Joox released Believers remixes of songs from Alan Walker which one of the remixes featured with Anneth.

In October 2021, Anneth was chosen to represent Indonesia in the 2021 Asia Song Festival and became the youngest performer in the event's history, aged 15.

In December 2021, Anneth was awarded as Best Asian Artist at the 2021 Mnet Asian Music Awards. She is the youngest winner for this category in the history of this event. She received this award at the age of 16.

Discography

Single

As lead artist

As featured artist

Album

Solo albums

Compilation albums

Filmography

Film

Web series

TV shows

Video clip

Herself

Other singer

Awards and nominations 
{| class="wikitable"
|-
! Year
! Awards
! Nomination
! Result
|-
| rowspan="11"|2021
| JOOX Indonesia Music Awards
|Indonesian Song of The Year (Mungkin Hari Ini Esok Atau Nanti)
|
|-
|Obsesi Awards
|Obsessed Young Celebrity
|
|-
|rowspan="5"|AMI Awards
|-
|Best of the Best New Artist (Mungkin Hari Ini Esok Atau Nanti)
|
|-
|Best Pop Female Solo Artist (Mungkin Hari Ini Esok Atau Nanti)
|
|-
|Best of the best Production Work (Mungkin Hari Ini Esok Atau Nanti)
|
|-
|Best Pop songwriter (Mungkin Hari Ini Esok Atau Nanti)
|
|-
|rowspan="3"|Indonesian Music Awards
|Social Media Artist of The Year
|
|-
|Female Singer of The Year
|
|-
|Song of The Year (Mungkin Hari Ini Esok Atau Nanti)
|
|-
|Mnet Asian Music Awards
|Best Asian Artist Indonesia
|

References

External links

 

Living people
2005 births
Indonesian child singers
21st-century Indonesian women singers
The Voice Indonesia